The following is a list of marathon races located in Asia and the Middle East.

Legend

Race list

Some of these marathons can be run in conjunction with shorter races.

References

 
Marathons in Asia